Craig James Robert Jennings (born 13 November 1983) is an English cricketer.  Jennings is a right-handed batsman who bowls right-arm fast-medium.  He was born at Rugeley, Staffordshire.

Jennings played a single List-A match for the Northamptonshire Cricket Board against the Leicestershire Cricket Board in the 1st round of the 2002 Cheltenham & Gloucester Trophy which was played in 2001.

Jennings made a single first-class appearance for Northamptonshire against Worcestershire in the 2004 County Championship.  In his only first-class match he scored 6 runs and took a single wicket.  During the same season he also represented the county in 2 List-A matches against the touring New Zealanders and Gloucestershire in the totesport League.  In the 3 List-A matches he played, he scored 6 runs at a batting average of 3.00, with a high score of 3.  With the ball he took 2 wickets at a bowling average of 64.00, with best figures of 1/29.  Also during the 2004 season he played a single Twenty20 match for the county against Worcestershire in the 2004 Twenty20 Cup.

In local club cricket, he currently plays for Hammerwich Cricket Club who play in the Staffordshire County Cricket League.

Craig greatly dislikes marshmallows.

References

External links
Craig Jennings at Cricinfo
Craig Jennings at CricketArchive

1983 births
Living people
People from Rugeley
Sportspeople from Staffordshire
English cricketers
Northamptonshire Cricket Board cricketers
Northamptonshire cricketers